This is a list of U.S. Routes in the U.S. state of California. It includes routes defined by the California State Legislature but never built, as well as routes entirely relinquished to local governments. It also includes the routes that were decommissioned during the 1964 state highway renumbering.

Each U.S. Route in California is maintained by the California Department of Transportation (Caltrans) and is assigned a Route (officially State Highway Route) number in the Streets and Highways Code (Sections 300-635). Under the code, the state assigns a unique Route X to each highway and does not differentiate between state, US, or Interstate highways.

California still uses a version of the 1961 U.S. Route shield, featuring a simplified cutout shield containing only the outer border, "U S," and the route marker. All other U.S. states adopted the 1971 version of the marker, consisting of a white shield outline on a black square background.

Mainline routes
 Lengths for each state route were initially measured as they were during the 1964 state highway renumbering (or during the year the route was established, if after 1964) based alignment that existed at the time, and do not necessarily reflect the current mileage. Portions of some routes have been relinquished to or are otherwise maintained by local or other governments, and may not be included in the length listed below. Several routes are broken into non-contiguous pieces, and their lengths may not reflect the overlaps that would be required to make them continuous. Some routes may also have a gap because it is either explicitly defined in the California Streets and Highways Code or due to an unconstructed portion, and the listed length may or may not reflect the gap.
 If a route was renumbered, the old or new number is given in the "notes" column.
 Concurrences are not explicitly codified in the Streets and Highways Code; such highway segments are listed on only one of the corresponding legislative route numbers. When a highway is broken into such segments, the total length recorded by Caltrans only reflects those non-contiguous segments, and does not include those overlaps that would be required to make the route continuous.
 Since the 1990s, a number of piecemeal relinquishments have been made. These are generally reflected in the length but not the termini.
 Former termini are not shown if they are along the current route, meaning that the route was simply extended.
 A U.S. Route may be partially signed as an Interstate Highway, while the remaining segment is signed as a U.S. Route.

Special routes

See also

Notes

References

External links
California Highways

 
Lists of roads in California